Jahadabad-e Narak (also Romanized as Jahādābād-e Nārak; also known as Jahādābād) is a village in Emamzadeh Jafar Rural District, in the Central District of Gachsaran County, Kohgiluyeh and Boyer-Ahmad Province, Iran. At the 2006 census, its population was 159, in 37 families.

References 

Populated places in Gachsaran County